= HRYW =

- Tegucigalpa; Honduras
- Frequency: 95.9 (MHz)
- Branding: Radio Panamericana

Ownership
- Owner: Sociedad Mercantil CIMADIAL S. de R.L.

History
- First air date: 1966

Technical information
- Licensing authority: CONATEL
- ERP: 5,000 watts

Links
- Webcast: Radio Panamerican Live
- Website: www.panamericanafm.com

HRYW (95.9 FM, "Radio Panamericana") is a radio station based in Tegucigalpa, Honduras under the corporate ownership of Sociedad Mercantil CIMADIAL S. de R.L. It broadcasts news, sport and music and station broadcasts on 95.9 MHz FM. The station has a target audience of over 35.It operates 24/7 and was authorized as a radio station since 1966 by the National Telecommunications Committee.And ratified in 2003.
